Telecom Advisory Committee (TAC) is a high level Indian government body made up of members of parliament and other members nominated by the Ministry of Communications and Information Technology to address issues concerning telecommunication in India. Looked upon as a privileged panel, the Telecom Advisory Committees, constituted by the Ministry of Communications and Information Technology (India) of the Government of India to serve as a vital feedback mechanism for improvement of services in the Telecommunications sector by the  Department of Telecommunications.

Ministers
       Shri Manoj Sinha Incumbent
       Shri Ravi Shankar Prasad 2014
	Shri Kapil Sibal	19.01.2011 to 26.05.2014
	Dr. Manmohan Singh	15.11.2010 to 15.11.2010
	Shri A. Raja	16.05.2007 to 14.11.2010
	Shri Dayanidhi Maran	23.05.2004 to 15.05.2007
	Shri Arun Shourie	29.01.2003 to 22.05.2004
	Shri Pramod Mahajan	02.09.2001 to 28.01.2003
	Shri Ram Vilas Paswan	13.10.1999 to 01.09.2001

Departments
Department of Telecommunications
Department of Electronics and Information Technology
Department of Posts
MTNLWebsite list of TAC members

Department of Telecommunications 

Also known as the Door Sanchar Vibhag, this department concerns itself with policy, licensing and coordination matters relating to telegraphs, telephones, wireless, data, facsimile and telematic services and other like forms of communications. It also looks into the administration of laws with respect to any of the matters specified, namely:
The Indian Telegraph Act, 1885 (13 of 1885)
The Indian Wireless Telegraphy Act, 1940 (17 of 1933)
The Telecom Regulatory Authority of India Act, 1997 (24 of 1997)

Public Sector Units
Bharat Sanchar Nigam Limited (BSNL)
Indian Telephone Industries Limited (ITI)
Bharat Broadband Network (BBNL)
Telecommunications Consultants India Limited (TCIL)

Mobile phone service operators in India 
 Aircel
 Bharti Airtel
 BSNL
 Idea Cellular
 MTNL
 MTS India
 Reliance Communications
 Tata DoCoMo
 Telenor India
 Videocon Mobile Service
 Vodafone India

See also 

 Centre for Excellence in Telecom Technology and Management
 Telecommunications in India
 Bharat Sanchar Nigam Limited
 MTNL Perfect Health Mela

List of TAC Members

References

External links
MTNL Website list of TAC members
Department of Telecommunications Website

Ministry of Communications and Information Technology (India)